Morning Coffee may refer to:

Morning Coffee (Firefox add-on), a Firefox add-on
"Morning Coffee" (song), a 1998 single by J-pop idol group Morning Musume
"Morning Coffee", a song by Herb Alpert from the 2009 album Anything Goes (Herb Alpert and Lani Hall album)
"Morning Coffee", a song by Don Amero from the 2020 extended play The Next Chapter

th:มอร์นิงคอฟฟี